There are a number of Elementary schools named Lowell Elementary School:

 Lowell Elementary School (Lowell, Arkansas)
 Lowell Elementary School (Santa Ana, California)
 Lowell Elementary School (Fresno, California)
 Lowell Elementary School (Boise, Idaho) 
 Lowell Elementary School (Wheaton, Illinois)
 Lowell Elementary School (Indianapolis, Indiana) 
 Lowell Elementary School (Kansas City, Kansas), listed on the National Register of Historic Places in Wyandotte County
 Lowell Elementary School (Duluth, Minnesota) 
 Lowell Elementary School (Seattle, Washington)